Internet Video Coding (ISO/IEC 14496-33, MPEG-4 IVC) is a video coding standard. IVC was created by MPEG, and was intended to be a royalty-free video coding standard for use on the Internet, as an alternative to non-free formats such as AVC and HEVC. As such, IVC was designed to only use (mostly old) coding techniques which were not covered by royalty-requiring patents.

According to a blog post by MPEG founder and chairman Leonardo Chiariglione in 2018, "IVC is practically dead." He said that three companies had made statements equivalent to "I may have patents and I am willing to license them at FRAND terms" covering IVC, meaning that implementations might have to pay money to the companies. These statements meant that IVC was not clearly a royalty-free video coding format; those companies would need to be contacted to determine whether they had essential patents and to determine the terms for their use which might involve the payment of some fees.

The ITU-T/ITU-R/ISO/IEC patent policy defines three types of patent licensing. The goal for IVC was to only use techniques patented under type 1 (royalty-free), while the three companies said they may have patents under type 2 (possibly requiring royalty payments). The text of the code of practice is as follows:
2.1 The patent holder is willing to negotiate licences free of charge with other parties on a non-discriminatory basis on reasonable terms and conditions. Such negotiations are left to the parties concerned and are performed outside ITU-T/ITU-R/ISO/IEC.

2.2 The patent holder is willing to negotiate licences with other parties on a non-discriminatory basis on reasonable terms and conditions. Such negotiations are left to the parties concerned and are performed outside ITU-T/ITU-R/ISO/IEC.

2.3 The patent holder is not willing to comply with the provisions of either paragraph 2.1 or paragraph 2.2; in such case, the Recommendation | Deliverable shall not include provisions depending on the patent.

History
MPEG issued a Call for Proposals in July 2011 for royalty-free video coding formats. Three proposals were received:

 Web Video Coding (WVC), proposed jointly by Apple, Cisco, Fraunhofer HHI, Magnum Semiconductors, Polycom, RIM, etc.. Web Video Coding was another name for the Constrained MPEG-4 AVC baseline profile.
 Video Coding for Browsers (VCB), proposed by Google and identical to Google's VP8.
 Internet Video Coding (IVC), proposed by several universities (Peking University, Tsinghua University, Zhejiang University, Hanyang University, Korea Aerospace University, etc.), and developed from scratch.

Web Video Coding did not have a guarantee from all patent holders that the patents covering Web Video Coding would be licensed royalty-free.

IVC's compression performance was reported to be better than that of WVC and VCB, and IVC was approved as ISO/IEC 14496–33 in June 2015.

See also
 Internet Video Codec (NETVC): project by IETF that had similar goals to IVC
 AOMedia Video 1 (AV1) from the Alliance for Open Media

References

Computer-related introductions in 2015
Film and video technology
 
Streaming television
MPEG-4 IVC
Vaporware
Video compression
Videotelephony